The Salming Trophy is awarded to the best Swedish-born defenceman. It is named after Börje Salming, who was named to the IIHF Centennial All-Star Team in 2008.

Winners

References 

Ice hockey people in Sweden
Ice hockey in Sweden
2008 establishments in Sweden
Awards established in 2008
Swedish ice hockey trophies and awards